Thomas Foley (1617–1677)  was an English ironmaster and politician who sat in the House of Commons at various times between 1659 and 1677.

Life
Foley was the eldest son of Richard Foley and his second wife Alice Brindley, herself the daughter of Sir William Brindley of Willenhall. His father was a prominent Midlands ironmaster of Stourbridge. Foley took over his father's business and made great profits from it in the 1650s and 1660s, which he used to buy estates. He was appointed High Sheriff of Worcestershire for 1656–57.

In 1659 he was elected Member of Parliament for Worcestershire in the Third Protectorate Parliament. He was elected MP for Bewdley in 1660 for the Convention Parliament. In 1673 he was elected MP for Bewdley in a by-election to the Cavalier Parliament.

Foley built Witley Court. In the late 1660s, he founded a bluecoat school at Stourbridge known as Old Swinford Hospital, which he endowed in his will.

Foley married Anne Browne, daughter of John Browne.  They had four sons and two daughters:
 Thomas Foley, whose granddaughter Elizabeth Foley married Robert Harley, later Prime Minister.
 Paul Foley, father of two politicians 
 Philip Foley
 Samuel Foley
 Martha Foley
 Sarah Foley

He handed his business over to his sons.

References

 

 

1616 births
1677 deaths
English ironmasters
Founders of English schools and colleges
English MPs 1659
English MPs 1660
English MPs 1661–1679
Thomas
High Sheriffs of Worcestershire
17th-century philanthropists
Members of the Parliament of England for Worcestershire